A cobra is any of several species of snake usually belonging to the family Elapidae.

Cobra or COBRA may also refer to:

Arts and entertainment

Fictional entities
 Cobra (G.I. Joe), the enemy faction in the G.I. Joe: A Real American Hero toy line and its related media
 Cobra (Marvel Comics), various Marvel Comics characters
 Cobra Unit, in the video game Metal Gear Solid 3: Snake Eater
 Professor Cobra, a villain and member of the Martian Empire in the third season of Yu-Gi-Oh GX
 Cobra, a fictional engineered virus in Richard Preston's novel The Cobra Event
 Cobra MkIV, a heavier multipurpose ship from the Elite Dangerous universe
 Cobra, a supervillain and assassin in the comic book series Haunt

Film and television
 Cobra (1925 film), an American silent film
 Cobra (1986 film), an American action film
 Cobra (1991 film), a Pakistani film
 Cobra (2012 film), an Indian Malayalam-language film
 Cobra (2022 film), an Indian Tamil-language film
 The Cobra (film), an Italian film
 Cobra (American TV series), a 1993–1994 American action television series
 COBRA (British TV series), a 2020 British political thriller television series
 Cobra Video, an American company producer
 Space Adventure Cobra: The Movie or Cobra, based on the manga of the same name

Literature
 Cobra, a 1972 novel by Cuban author Severo Sarduy
 Cobra (manga), a 1978 manga by Buichi Terasawa
 COBRA (Timothy Zahn novel series), a novel series by Timothy Zahn and the first (1985) novel in the series
 The Cobra (novel), a 2010 thriller novel by Frederick Forsyth

Music
 Cobra (American band), a 1980s hard rock band
 Cobra (Chinese band), a Chinese all-female rock band
 Cobra (Japanese band), a Japanese punk band
 The Cobras, an American band in the late 1970s which featured Stevie Ray Vaughan
 Cobra (album), a 1987 album by John Zorn
 Cobra (Zorn), a musical composition by John Zorn
 "C.O.B.R.A." (Marie-Mai song)
 "Cobra", a 2004 song by the band Winnebago Deal
 "Cobra" (composition), a 2011 instrumental composition by Hardwell
 Cobra Records, an independent record label (1956–1959)

Roller coasters
 Cobra (La Ronde), Canada
 Cobra (Tivoli Friheden), Denmark
 Cobra, a Gerstlauer Bobsled Coaster at Paultons Park, Hampshire, England
 Cobra (PowerPark), Finland
 Cobra, a roller coaster at Six Flags Discovery Kingdom, California, United States

Other arts and entertainment
 COBRA (art movement), active from 1948 to 1951

Government and police
 Coastal Barrier Resources Act, a U.S. act of 1982
 Cabinet Office Briefing Rooms, used by UK government crisis response committees for meetings
 Cobras (Serbia), a Serbian military police unit
 Commando Battalion for Resolute Action, an Indian paramilitary unit
 Consolidated Omnibus Budget Reconciliation Act of 1985, a US federal statute, or health insurance provided under the act
 EKO Cobra, an Austrian counter-terror police squad

Places
 Cobra Station, a sheep station in Western Australia
 Ilha das Cobras, an island in Rio de Janeiro, Brazil

Products and companies
 Cobra Beer, produced in the UK
 Cobra Golf, a brand of golf clubs and outdoor equipment
 The Cobra Group, a marketing company
 Cobra Energy Drink, an energy drink produced by Philippines-based Asia Brewery

Science and technology

Vehicles

Automobiles
 AC Cobra, a British sports car built in the 1960s, known in the US as Ford/Shelby Cobra
 Ford Falcon Cobra, a limited edition of the Ford Falcon
 Ford Mustang SVT Cobra, a sports car built by Ford between 1993 and 2004
 Ford Shelby Cobra Concept, a 2004 Ford concept car based on the 1960s Cobra
 Cobra, a 1960s Ford Shelby Mustang variant
 Torino Cobra, a 1968–1971 model of the Ford Torino

Military
 COBRA (radar), a counter-battery radar system
 Cobra BMT-2 APC, an Iranian armored personnel carrier
 ACEC Cobra, a Belgian Army armored personnel carrier
 Bell AH-1 Cobra, a US Army attack helicopter
 HMS Cobra (1899), a British Royal Navy destroyer
 Otokar Cobra, a Turkish light armoured vehicle
 Northrop YF-17, a fighter aircraft prototype nicknamed Cobra
 USS Cobra (SP-626), a US Navy patrol boat

Other vehicles
 Bombardier Cobra, in Zürich, Switzerland
 Evektor VUT100 Cobra, a Czech light aircraft

Weapons
 Cobra (missile), a Swiss/German anti-tank missile
 Colt Cobra, a line of small-caliber revolvers

Other science and technology
 Cobra (programming language), a computer programming language
 Cobra ciphers, a series of block ciphers in cryptography
 COBRA rocket engine, proposed by Pratt & Whitney-Aerojet for the US Space Launch Initiative
 CobraNet, a proprietary system for transmitting digital audio over Ethernet
 COBRAcable, a submarine power cable under construction between the Netherlands and Denmark
 Combined bisulfite restriction analysis, a molecular biology technique 
 Ericofon, or Cobra Phone, a landmark of 20th century industrial design
 Novell "Cobra", codename for Novell NetWare 5.1
 CoBra, an automobile engine made by Crosley
 Cobra, a ZX Spectrum clone built in Braşov, Romania; see List of ZX Spectrum clones
 Cobra, a processor in the IBM RS64 line of CPUs

Sport

Teams and clubs
 Adelaide Cobras FC, an Australian soccer club
 Bangkok Cobras, an Asean Basketball League team
 Cape Cobras, a cricket team based in Cape Town, South Africa
 Carolina Cobras, a former Arena Football team (2000–2004)
 Charlotte Cobras, a Major Indoor Lacrosse League team in 1996
 Chicago Cobras, a former American women's soccer club (2003–2004)
 Cleveland Cobras, an American soccer club
 Cobra Sport, a South Sudanese basketball team
 Cobras de Ciudad Juárez, a Mexican football club
 COBRA Rugby Club of Malaysia
 Lapua Cobras, a Finnish basketball team
 Nordsjælland Cobras, a Danish ice hockey team
 SWU Cobras, the sports teams of Southwestern University of Cebu City, Philippines
 Terrebonne Cobras, a Canadian Junior ice hockey team

People
 Jeff Farmer (wrestler) (born 1962), American professional wrestler
 Carl Froch (born 1977), boxing world champion
 Juan José Muñante (1948–2019), soccer player
 Dave Parker (born 1951), former Major League Baseball player
 Gary Simmons (ice hockey) (born 1944), NHL goaltender
 George Takano (born 1958), Japanese professional wrestler
 Mad Cobra (born 1968), or simply Cobra, stage name of Jamaican musician Ewart Everton Brown
 Michael Willson, a.k.a. Cobra, from the TV show Gladiators

Other sport and fitness
 Bhujangasana, a yoga posture known as Cobra Pose
 The Cobra, a wrestling move used by Santino Marella (born 1979)

Other uses
Cobra: Game of the Normandy Breakout, a 1977 board wargame about the Battle of Normandy during World War II
 COBRA (consumer theory) (consumer's online brand related activities)
 Cobra maneuver, an aerobatics maneuver
 Common Object Request Broker Architecture (CORBA), a computer communications standard
 Operation Cobra, a 1944 World War II battle
 Robert Hatem (b. c. 1956), Lebanese former bodyguard and non-fiction writer also known by his codename, Cobra
 Typhoon Cobra, a Pacific storm

See also
 Kobra (disambiguation)